Łukasz Krzysztof Wielewiejski (16 October 1660 – 28 January 1743) was a Roman Catholic prelate who served as Titular Bishop of Cambysopolis (1726–1743).

Biography
Łukasz Krzysztof Wielewiejski was born in Gradoliz on 16 October 1660.
On 11 September 1726, he was appointed during the papacy of Pope Benedict XIII as Titular Bishop of Cambysopolis.
On 29 September 1726, he was consecrated bishop by Pope Benedict XIII with Francesco Antonio Finy, Titular Archbishop of Damascus, and Nicolas-Xavier Santamarie, Titular Bishop of Cyrene, serving as co-consecrators. 
He served as Titular Bishop of Cambysopolis until his death on 28 January 1743. 

While bishop, he was the principal co-consecrator of Baltazar Wilksycki, Titular Bishop of Eucarpia and Auxiliary Bishop of Poznań (1728).

See also 
Diocese of Alexandretta

References 

18th-century Roman Catholic titular bishops
Bishops appointed by Pope Benedict XIII
1660 births
1743 deaths